(DGS) is the German umbrella organization for sport of deaf and people with hearing impairments. The DGS is a registered organization seated in Essen.

History 
In the mid-19th century, a group of gymnasts, bowlers and chess players met to form teams. With the establishment of the "" (Berlin Deaf Gymnastics Association) on 18 October 1888, the foundation was laid for the organization of deaf athletes. The group added women's and children's divisions in 1896.

Throughout the early 20th century (interrupted only by the outbreak of World War I which brought much of Germany's amateur athletic pursuits to a standstill), the various deaf athletic associations grew and merged, resulting in the culmination: the formation of the DGS in Hanover in 1946.

Goals 
Development, maintenance and further development of the deaf sports and especially of youth sports
To represent the deaf sports at home and abroad, whether to individuals, clubs, associations or governments and all related matters to the common benefit of all members shall be based on sporting spirit
Make sure that the deaf sports will be held within the Federal Republic of Germany in accordance with national and international regulations
Training of trainers and coaches, and the promotion of sports courses and the introduction of measures of general education and youth sport nursing kind
Competitions in the respective sports in DGS operated German deaf champion to be determined in national cup competitions the winner to set up the necessary arrangements for this purpose as part of his orders to carry out further international matches and the necessary preparation for their games and training sessions

Past presidents

Honorary members 
 Theo Krumscheid (†)
 Harry Förster (†)
 Käthi George

Sponsors, partners and supporters

Sponsors 
Federal Ministry of the Interior (Germany)
German sports aid foundation

Partners

General partners 
Volkswagen Group
powerone
Verband der Deutschen Automatenindustrie (VDAI, Federation of German vending industry)
Mundipharma GmbH

Media partners 
German deaf newspaper
Life in sight
German cochlear implant Society
Schnecke-online.de

Supporter 
Reha Com Tech
SnowTrex

See also 
Deaflympics
Deaf people in the Olympics

References

External links 
dg-sv.de - Official website

German Deaf Sports Association
1910 establishments in Germany
Sports organisations of Germany
Deaf culture in Germany